Mocambo is a restaurant on Park Street, Kolkata which opened in 1956. It has been claimed to be India's first nightclub.

References

1956 establishments in West Bengal
Restaurants in Kolkata
Restaurants established in 1956